Herrod is a surname. Notable people with the surname include:

Bob Herrod (1866−1918), English footballer
Christopher Herrod (born 1965), American politician
Darryl Herrod (born 1945), Australian rules footballer
Jeff Herrod (born 1966), American football player

See also
Herod (disambiguation)
Harrod (disambiguation)